2012 was the eleventh year of Cage Warriors, a mixed martial arts promotion based in the United Kingdom, comprising twelve events beginning with Cage Warriors Fight Night 3.

Events list

Cage Warriors Fight Night 3

Cage Warriors Fight Night 3 was an event held on February 11, 2012 in Beirut, Lebanon.

Cage Warriors: 45

Cage Warriors: 45 was an event held on February 18, 2012 in London, England.

Cage Warriors: 46

Cage Warriors: 46 was an event held on February 23, 2012 in Kyiv, Ukraine.

Cage Warriors Fight Night 4

Cage Warriors Fight Night 4 was an event held on March 16, 2012 in Dubai, UAE.

Cage Warriors Fight Night 5

Cage Warriors Fight Night 5 was an event held on April 12, 2012 in Amman, Jordan.

Cage Warriors Fight Night 6

Cage Warriors Fight Night 6 was an event held on May 24, 2012 in Isa Town, Bahrain.

Cage Warriors: 47

Cage Warriors: 47 was an event held on June 2, 2012 in Dublin, Ireland.

Cage Warriors: 48

Cage Warriors: 48 was an event held on July 21, 2012 in London, England.

Cage Warriors Fight Night 7

Cage Warriors Fight Night 7 was an event held on September 1, 2012 in Amman, Jordan.

Cage Warriors: 49

Cage Warriors: 49 was an event held on October 27, 2012 in Cardiff, Wales.

Cage Warriors: 50

Cage Warriors: 50 was an event held on December 8, 2012 in Glasgow, Scotland.

Cage Warriors: 51

Cage Warriors: 51 was an event held on December 31, 2012 in Dublin, Ireland.

References

2012 in mixed martial arts
Cage Warriors events